Janet King may refer to:

 Janet King (Dad's Army), a recurring character on the British television sitcom Dad's Army
 Janet King (character), a character from the Australian television shows Crownies and Janet King
 Janet King (TV series), a television show spin-off from the show Crownies